The 1969 Baylor Bears football team represented Baylor University in the Southwest Conference (SWC) during the 1969 NCAA University Division football season. In their first season under head coach Bill Beall, the Bears compiled a 0–10 record (0–7 against conference opponents), finished in last place in the conference, and were outscored by opponents by a combined total of 344 to 87. They played their home games at Baylor Stadium in Waco, Texas.

The team's statistical leaders included Steve Stuart with 535 passing yards, Randy Cooper with 364 rushing yards, Jerry Smith with 373 receiving yards, and Gene Rogers and Pinkie Palmer with 36 points scored each. Gordon Utgard was the team captain.

Schedule

References

Baylor
Baylor Bears football seasons
Baylor Bears football